Gaël Prevost (born 8 March 1994 in Clermont-Ferrand) is a French archer.  At the 2012 Summer Olympics he competed for his country in the men's team event.

References

1994 births
French male archers
Living people
Olympic archers of France
Archers at the 2012 Summer Olympics
World Archery Championships medalists
Sportspeople from Clermont-Ferrand